The Llonja de Sant Jordi is a room of exhibitions of Alcoy (Alicante), Valencian Community, located under the floor of the Plaça d'Espanya (Spain Square).

It is designed by the valencian architect Santiago Calatrava. Made during the years 1992-1995. Its internal structure is reminiscent of the rib of a whale. It also highlighted the mechanisms that give access to the underground room and the fountain of the square.

References

External links 

 Location on Google Maps

Santiago Calatrava structures
High-tech architecture
Modernist architecture in Spain
Buildings and structures in Alcoy
Tourist attractions in the Valencian Community
1995 establishments in Spain
Neo-futurism architecture